Seth De Witte (born 18 October 1987) is a Belgian football midfielder.

Club career
On 26 August 2019, he signed a 1-year contract with Lokeren.

Honours
Mechelen
 Belgian Cup: 2018–19

References

External links
 

1987 births
Living people
Belgian footballers
Beerschot A.C. players
Lierse S.K. players
K.V. Mechelen players
K.S.C. Lokeren Oost-Vlaanderen players
K.M.S.K. Deinze players
Belgian Pro League players
Challenger Pro League players
Association football midfielders
Footballers from Antwerp